Heimdal is the sixteenth studio album by Norwegian extreme metal band Enslaved, released 3 March 2023 by Nuclear Blast.

Background
The album is titled after a character in Norse mythology, whom the band calls "fascinating" and who has appeared in their lyrics several times throughout their career, starting as early as their second demo tape, Yggdrasill, in 1992. The album contains six new songs, plus "Caravans to the Outer Worlds" which had previously appeared on an EP of the same title in 2021. The band structured that stopgap EP as a bridge between their previous full-length album Utgard (2020) and Heimdal, and determined that the song "Caravans to the Outer Worlds" fit into the new album both lyrically and musically.

Critical reception
Upon its release, Heimdal received positive reviews from heavy metal-oriented publications. Kerrang! called the album "stunning" and described it as "a foundation of black metal at its most vast and Pink Floyd at their most spacious." Blabbermouth praised the album and concluded that Enslaved can "still find a way to remain true to their origins while defining extreme metal progression." Distorted Sound noted the album's mix of black metal and progressive rock, and suggested that it may be the best of the band's career.

Rock n' Load, also suggested that Heimdal might be one of Enslaved's best albums, and that it is more engaging than their last several studio albums. MetalSucks called the album "Awe-inspiring, spellbinding, and imaginative," and concluded that "Heimdal reflects total authenticity combined with artistic brilliance." According to Ghost Cult, Heimdal is "a grand vision that Enslaved have executed to perfection, on an album that is up there with their best." A reviewer for No Clean Singing found some of the songwriting to be predictable, but concluded that the album "finds Enslaved once more turning their gaze towards new horizons."

Track listing

Personnel
Ivar Bjørnson – electric guitars, acoustic guitars, synthesizers, keyboards, sequencer, FX, backing vocals (track 1)
Grutle Kjellson – vocals, bass guitar, synthesizer
Iver Sandøy – vocals, drums, percussion, keyboards, FX
Håkon Vinje – keyboards, piano, vocals
Arve Isdal – electric guitars

Charts

References 

2023 albums
Enslaved (band) albums
Nuclear Blast albums